Gorum, or Parengi, is a nearly-extinct minor Munda language of India.

Names
The name Gorum most likely comes from an animal/people prefix go- and root -rum meaning 'people', and is possibly related to the ethnonym Remo (Anderson 2008:381).

Parengi, or Parenga, is of obscure origin.

Status
Gorum is 60% endangered, it is very likely that it might soon be extinct majority of the people under 30 years cannot understand the language. In addition those who know it are likely to deny knowing it. This language seems to have been first researched in 1933, that being the earliest scholarly reference.

Origins
While Gorum is a member of the Munda family, it has taken some things from Dravidian, a language spoken nearby. For example, they tend to doubly inflect on certain types of AVC structures. Another derivation from the Munda language is the use of some Glottals being "creaky voiced"

Distribution
Gorum speakers are located in the following areas of eastern India (Anderson 2008:381).
Koraput district, Odisha: the former Nandapur and Pottangi taluks
Visakhapatnam district, Andhra Pradesh: Munchingput block

Gutob is spoken to the north of Gorum, and Gta to the west of Gorum.

References

Anderson, Gregory D.S (ed). 2008. The Munda languages. Routledge Language Family Series 3.New York: Routledge. .

External links
 Endangered Language Project Database
 World Language Movies
 Opino Gomango on Sora language
 Bibliography on the Gorum language
 Gorum Dictionary

Munda languages
Endangered languages of India